Mallota bautias is a species of hoverfly (Diptera: Syrphidae). It is known for being particularly bee-like.  It is found in eastern North America.

References

External links
 Live and pinned adult images (Jeff Skevington, Field Guide to Flower Flies of Ontario)
 Description and key to species (Daniel Shorter and W.A. Drew, Syrphidae of Oklahoma)

Diptera of North America
Insects described in 1849
Eristalinae
Taxa named by Francis Walker (entomologist)
Hoverflies of North America